WR 156 is a young massive and luminous Wolf–Rayet star in the constellation of Cepheus.  Although it shows a WR spectrum, it is thought to be a young star still fusing hydrogen in its core.

Distance
WR 156 has a Hipparcos parallax of 3.16" indicating a distance of about a thousand light years, although with a fairly large margin of error. Other studies indicate that it is much more distant based on a very high luminosity and faint apparent magnitude. The Gaia DR1 parallax is 0.07". The margin of error is larger than the measured parallax, but still the indication is for a very large distance. In Gaia Data Release 2, the parallax is given as  but with a marker that the result may be unreliable.

Physical properties
WR 156 has a WR spectrum on the nitrogen sequence, indicating strong emission of helium and nitrogen, but it also shows features of hydrogen. Therefore, it is given a spectral type of WN8h. Its outer layers are calculated to contain 30% hydrogen, one of the highest levels for any galactic Wolf Rayet star.

WR 156 has a low temperature and slow stellar wind by Wolf Rayet standards, only 39,800 K and 660 km/s respectively. The wind is very dense, with total mass loss of more than /year.

WR 156 is a young hydrogen-rich star, still burning hydrogen in its core but sufficiently luminous to have convected up nitrogen and helium fusion products to its surface. It shows 27% hydrogen at its surface. It is estimated to have had an initial mass of  several million years ago.

References

Wolf–Rayet stars
Cepheus (constellation)
113569
J23001010+6055385